KWDR may refer to:

 KWDR (FM), a radio station (93.5 FM) licensed to Royal City, Washington, United States
 Northeast Georgia Regional Airport (ICAO code KWDR)